Chityala may refer to:

 Chityal, Ranga Reddy, Andhra Pradesh, India
 Chityal, Nalgonda district, Telangana, India
 Chityal, Warangal, Telangana, India
 Chityala Ailamma (1919–1985), Indian revolutionary leader